San Pedro is a Romanesque-style Roman Catholic church in the Mestas de Con neighborhood of Cangas de Onís, in the community of Asturias, Spain.

See also
Asturian art
Catholic Church in Spain

References

Churches in Asturias
Romanesque architecture in Asturias
Bien de Interés Cultural landmarks in Asturias